The 2014 Italian Athletics Championships was the 104th edition of the Italian Athletics Championships and were held in Rovereto from 18 to 20 July 2014.

Champions

References

External links 
 Italian Athletics Federation

Italian Athletics Championships
Athletics
Italian Athletics Outdoor Championships